The New Granada sea catfish, or Cazon sea catfish (Notarius bonillai) is a species of catfish in the family Ariidae. It is endemic to the Atrato and Magdalena River basins in Colombia.

References

 
 
 

Ariidae
Catfish of South America
Freshwater fish of Colombia
Magdalena River
Fish described in 1945
Taxonomy articles created by Polbot